The Tri-State Conference was an intercollegiate athletic conference that existed from 1923 to 1934 and one of two conferences to share this name. The league had members in the Tri-State region of Ohio, Pennsylvania, and West Virginia.

Football champions

 1924 – Geneva and 
 1925 – Geneva
 1926 – Geneva
 1927 – Geneva
 1928 – Duquesne and 
 1929 – Duquesne
 1930 – 
 1931 – 
 1932 – 
 1933 –

See also
 List of defunct college football conferences

References

 
College sports in Pennsylvania
College sports in West Virginia